Odile Caradec (15 February 1925 – 22 September 2021) was a French poet.

Publications
 Tout un monde fluide, illustrations Pierre de Chevilly, Éd. Océanes, 2017. 
 République Terre - Republik Erde, bilingue français-allemand, illustrations Claudine Goux, Odile Verlag, 2013. 
 Le ciel, le cœur, bilingue français-allemand, illustrations Claudine Goux, éditions en Forêt, 2011. 
 Le sang, cavalier rouge, Sac à mots éditions, 2010.
 En belle terre noire, bilingue français-allemand, illustrations Claudine Goux, éditions en Forêt, 2008.
 Masses tourbillonnantes, illustrations de Pierre de Chevilly, Éd. Océanes, 2007.
 Chats, dames, étincelles, bilingue français-allemand, illustrations Claudine Goux, éditions en Forêt, 2005.
 Cymbales lointaines, éditinter, 2003.
 Silence, volubilis!, éditinter, 2002.
 Les Moines solaires, Éd. associatives Clapàs, 2002
 De création en crémation, éditions L’Amateur, 2001
 Chant d'ostéoporose, éditinter, 2000
 Bretagne aux étoiles, La Porte, 2000. 
 Vaches, automobiles, violoncelles, avec 32 illustrations couleur, édit. bilingue français-allemand ; traduit par édit.en Forêt, Rimbach, Allemagne.
 Jusqu'à la garde, gravures sur bois Alfred Pohl, chez Thomas Reche, Passau, 1997.
 L'Âge Phosphorescent, Fondamente, 1996.
 Citron rouge, Le Dé Bleu, 1996, Prix Charles Vildrac de la SGDL, 1996.
 Santal et clavier pourpre, éditions de L'Arbre à Paroles, 1994.
 La Nuit, velours côtelé, Le Nadir, 1988.
 Les Barbes transparentes, Le Dé bleu, 1981.
 Reprise des vides, édit. Le Verbe et l'Empreinte, 1981.
 Le Tricorne d'eau douce, éd. Jean-Jacques Sergent, 1977
 Le Collant intégral, éditions St Germain-des-Prés, 1975.
 À Vélo, immortels, éditions St Germain-des-Prés, 1974.
 L'Épitaphe évolutive d'un chauve, Fagne, 1972.
 Potirons sur le toit, Traces, 1972.
 Nef lune, Traces, 1969.

References

1925 births
2021 deaths
French poets
Poets from Brittany
Writers from Brest, France